Novosibirsk State University of Architecture and Civil Engineering is a state university in Oktyabrsky District of  Novosibirsk, Russia. It was founded in 1930.

History
The educational institution was created in 1930 on the basis of the Civil Engineering Faculty of the Siberian Institute of Technology (Tomsk).

In 1933, Siberian Technological Institute moved from Tomsk to Novosibirsk.

In 1935, the institute was renamed into Novosibirsk Civil Engineering Institute named after V.V. Kuibyshev.

In 1939, Novosibirsk Institute of Engineers of Geodesy, Aerial Photography and Cartography was organized on the basis of the Engineering and Geodetic Faculty of the Institute.

In 1980 the institute was awarded the Order of the Red Banner of Labor.

In 1981, the Faculty for Working with Foreign Students was established.

In 1987–1989, Novosibirsk Architectural Institute (now Novosibirsk State University of Architecture, Design and Arts) was founded on the basis of the Faculty of Architecture of the Institute.

In 1993, the institute was renamed into Novosibirsk State Academy of Civil Engineering.

In 1998, the educational institution was renamed Novosibirsk State University of Architecture and Civil Engineering.

In 2015, the UNESCO Chair ("Theory and technology of Environmental Safety in Water Resources Control") was established at the institute.

Faculties
 Faculty of Civil Engineering (since 1930)
 Environmental Engineering Faculty (since 1934)
 Faculty of Engineering and Information Technologies (since 1944)
 Center for Work with Foreign Students (since 1981)
 Institute of Architecture and Urban Planning

Notable alumni
 Vadim Bakatin, Soviet and Russian politician, last chairman of the KGB
 Sergey Balandin, Soviet and Russian architect
 Sergey Levchenko, Russian politician, the Governor of Irkutsk Oblast (2015—2019)
 Nikolay Vasilyev, Soviet architect

External links
 Official website of Sibstrin. (English version).
 The development of high-quality design solutions requires overcoming conservatism, the Plenipotentiary Representative believes. Official website of the Plenipotentiary Representative of the President of the Russian Federation.
 Novosibirsk State University of Architecture and Civil Engineering. Edarabia.

Education in Novosibirsk
Oktyabrsky District, Novosibirsk
Architecture schools in Russia
Educational institutions established in 1930
1930 establishments in Russia
Universities in Novosibirsk Oblast
Engineering universities and colleges in Russia